Gustavo Leonardo Cuéllar Gallegos (born 14 October 1992) is a Colombian professional footballer who plays as a midfielder for Saudi Arabian club Al-Hilal and the Colombia national team.

Career

Deportivo Cali
Cuéllar began playing for the Deportivo Cali youth setup and made his professional debut in 2009. He scored his first professional goal in the first match of the 2013 Categoría Primera A season Apertura tournament against Once Caldas. It was the winning goal of a 2-1 victory. Cuéllar formed a key part of the 2013 squad that finished runners-up in 2013 Torneo Finalización, losing in the finals to Atlético Nacional.

Junior (loan)
Cuéllar was loaned to Atlético Junior from mid-2014 to mid-2016. Junior were eliminated in the round-robin stage of the 2014 Torneo Finalización. With the arrival of Alexis Mendoza as manager in 2015 Cuéllar established himself as one of the team's best players, participating in nearly 50 matches.

Flamengo
On January 20, 2016 Deportivo Cali confirmed that Cuéllar would be transferred to Brazilian giants Flamengo. The transfer fee was reported to be close to R$8 million for 70% of his economic rights.

In his first season with the Brazilian club he could not establish himself as a regular starter. Cuéllar played 16 Brazilian Série A matches, only four as a starter, and managed to play a total 33 matches throughout the season.

During the beginning of the 2017 Brazilian Série A season rumors in the Brazilian media linked Cuéllar with Vitória on a possible loan. Despite the interest from other clubs, Cuéllar started to receive more chances in the first team, including playing as a starter. Flamengo won the 2017 Campeonato Carioca with 6 appearances by Cuéllar. On June 28, 2017 in a Copa do Brasil match against Santos at Ilha do Urubu, Cuéllar scored his first goal for Flamengo in a  2-0 victory.

Only after Flamengo signed compatriot Reinaldo Rueda as head coach did Cuéllar  manage to take a starting position in the midfield. He played a total of 51 matches in the season scoring two goals, including 25 Brazilian Série A matches.

On June 8, 2018 Cuéllar extended his contract with Flamengo until June 2022, this new contract raised his release clause from €50m to €70m.

Cuéllar continued to be a star player for Flamengo in central midfield, helping to capture the 2019 Campeonato Carioca. He continued to be a transfer target for some European clubs. In August 2019, Cuéllar was be suspended from club activities indefinitely for refusing to travel with the team for the following league match, citing family matters. He was reintegrated into the squad ahead of Flamengo's Copa Libertadores quarter-final match against Internacional, which would be his final match for the club.

Al-Hilal
On August 30, 2019, Saudi Arabian club Al-Hilal announced the signing of Cuéllar from Flamengo. The fee was reported to be €7.5m.

International career
Gustavo played for Colombia U17 in the 2009 FIFA U-17 World Cup, he appeared in all seven matches and scored two goals, both against Gambia in a 2-2 draw, as the team finished the tournament in fourth place.

He also represented Colombia U20 in the 2011 South American U-20 Championship, he had five appearances and the team finished the tournament in the sixth place.

On September 8, 2015 Gustavo debuted for Colombia as a starter in a 1-1 draw against Peru in Harrison, United States.

In May 2018 he was named in Colombia’s preliminary 35 man squad for the 2018 FIFA World Cup in Russia. However, he did not make the final cut to 23.

On May 30, 2019 Cuéllar was named by manager Carlos Queiroz to the 23-man squad for the 2019 Copa América in Brazil. He made one appearance in the group stage, appearing in the starting lineup and scoring the winning goal against Paraguay.

Career statistics

Club

International

International goals
Colombia score listed first, score column indicates score after each Cuéllar goal.

Honours

Club
Deportivo Cali
Copa Colombia: 2010

Junior
Copa Colombia: 2015

Flamengo
Campeonato Carioca: 2017, 2019,

Al-Hilal
Saudi Professional League: 2019–20, 2020–21, 2021–22
King Cup: 2019–20
AFC Champions League: 2019 2021
 Saudi Super Cup: 2021

Individual
Campeonato Carioca Team of the Year: 2019

References

External links

 Instagram

Living people
1992 births
Colombian footballers
Colombian expatriate footballers
Colombian expatriate sportspeople in Brazil
Colombia international footballers
Colombia under-20 international footballers
Categoría Primera A players
Campeonato Brasileiro Série A players
Saudi Professional League players
Deportivo Cali footballers
Atlético Junior footballers
CR Flamengo footballers
Al Hilal SFC players
2019 Copa América players
2021 Copa América players
Expatriate footballers in Brazil
Expatriate footballers in Saudi Arabia
Colombian expatriate sportspeople in Saudi Arabia
Association football midfielders
Footballers from Barranquilla